Koninklijke Haarlemsche Football Club (Royal Haarlem Football Club) is a football club based in Haarlem, Netherlands. It is the oldest existing club in Dutch football, founded by Pim Mulier in 1879. During the club's early years the team only played rugby but due to financial problems they then switched to association football. The first official football match in the Netherlands was played in 1886 between HFC and Amsterdam Sport.

The club currently play in the Tweede Divisie (Second Division), a semi-professional tier re-established for the 2016–17 season, which is the third tier of the Dutch football pyramid and the highest non-pro league.

History 
Koninklijke HFC was the first Dutch Rugby club, established on 15 September 1879 by the 14-year-old Pim Mulier, who first encountered the sport in 1870. However HFC switched to association football in 1883. (The Delftsche Studenten Rugby Club was the first official rugby club on 24 September 1918.)

In 1899 they moved from their original ground "De Koekamp" to the "Spanjaardslaan", where they still play their home matches to this day. At that period the Spanjaardslaan (Spaniard's Lane), the east-west road at the southern edge of the oldest public park of the Netherlands, was part of the neighbouring town of Heemstede, but switched back to be part of Haarlem in 1927. 

The Netherlands national football team have played two international matches at the Spanjaardslaan. Both matches were versus Belgium, resulting in a 1–2 loss and a 7–0 win. In the past HFC has contributed several players to the Netherlands national football team. Of those players, goalkeeper Gejus van der Meulen obtained the most caps, 54. At present his grandson still plays for HFC.

Before the Dutch championship was officially established, HFC won three unofficial national titles:
 1889–1890
 1892–1893
 1894–1895

Three times in the club's history they have won the KNVB Cup (1904, 1913 and 1915). In the cup competition of 1903–1904 HFC beat VVV from Amsterdam 25–0, which still remains a record score in the Dutch cup competition.

The club was named Koninklijk (Royal) in 1959, 80 years after the club was founded. Since 1923 the first team of HFC plays the opening match of a new year versus a selection of former Dutch international players on 1 January.

Current squad

See also
Club of Pioneers

References

Koninklijke HFC
Football clubs in the Netherlands
Football clubs in Haarlem
Sports clubs in Haarlem
History of Haarlem
Association football clubs established in 1879
1879 establishments in the Netherlands
Organisations based in the Netherlands with royal patronage
Defunct rugby union teams
Defunct sports teams in the Netherlands